The 2015 ADAC Zurich 24 Hours of Nürburgring was the 43rd running of the 24 Hours of Nürburgring. It took place over 14–17 May 2015.

The #28 Audi Sport Team WRT won the race on an Audi R8 LMS.

Race results

Class winners in bold.

References

External links

 2015 24 Hours of Nürburgring official results

Nürburgring 24 Hours
2015 in German motorsport
May 2015 sports events in Germany